Campbell Copelin (1901–1988) was an English actor, who moved to Australia in the 1920s and worked extensively in film, theatre, radio and television. He had a notable association with J.C. Williamson Ltd and frequently collaborated with F. W. Thring and Frank Harvey. He often played villains.

Biography
He served in the Army, then emigrated to Australia. He worked on the land, then as a commercial artist before deciding to become an actor.

Criminal History 
In 1928 he was fined for using indecent language and resisting arrest.

On the night of 18 March 1931 Copelin took a £1,000 plane out for a joyride in Melbourne and crashed it into Sandridge golf links, causing him to spend several months in hospital. "I had never seen Melbourne by night," he said, "so I decided to have a look. It was wonderful and I'm going to have another look as soon as I can, but next time I'll do it In a safer way."

He was charged with stealing the plane but these charges were later withdrawn on the basis that he had suffered enough through his injuries. Years later he said he was injured in a general plane accident.

In 1933 Copelin was arrested and fined for stealing a police bicycle.

Selected filmography

Film
Two Minutes Silence (1933)
Clara Gibbings (1934) - Errol Kerr
The Streets of London (1934)
A Ticket in Tatts (1934) - Harvey Walls
Sheepmates (1934, abandoned)
It Isn't Done (1937) - Ronald Dudley
Tall Timbers (1937) - Charles Blake
Lovers and Luggers (1938) - Archie
Typhoon Treasure (1938) - Alan Richards
Brighton Rock (1948) - Police Inspector
Kiss the Blood Off My Hands (1948) - Publican
Hills of Home (1948) - Minor Role (uncredited)
Command Decision (1948) - Correspondent (uncredited)
Sword in the Desert (1949) - Sgt. Chapel
Challenge to Lassie (1949) - Thief (uncredited)
Twelve O'Clock High (1949) - Mr. Britton (uncredited)
Three Came Home (1950) - English Radio Announcer (uncredited)
Please Believe Me (1950) - English Bobby (uncredited)
Rogues of Sherwood Forest (1950) - Officer (uncredited)
Portrait of Clare (1950) - Inspector Cunningham
Midnight Episode (1950) - The General
The Brown Man's Servant (Nosey Wheeler) (45 minutes short film, with Victor Platt

TV Credits
Saturday Special (1951-53) (Mr. Pike), in 2, of 35, episodes.
A Dead Secret (1959, TV Movie)
Night of the Ding Dong (1959, TV Movie) - Mr. Kelp
Marriage Lines (1962, TV Movie)
Lola Montez (1962, TV Movie)
The Angry General (1964, TV Movie)

Select Theatre Credits

The Unfair Sex (1927)
Eliza Comes to Stay (1927)
Outward Bound (1927)
The Last Warning (1927)
The Alarm Clock (1927)
Scandal (1928)
Sport of Kings (1928)
Bird in Hand (1929)
This Thing Called Love (1930)
In Port (1930)
Eliza Comes to Stay (1930)
On the Spot (1931)
The Calendar (1931)
A Warm Corner (1931)
As Husbands Go (1931)
The Streets of London (1933)
Rope (1933)
Collits' Inn (1933)
Mother of Pearl (1934)
The Shining Hour (1935)
Night Must Fall (1936)
Lovers Leap (1936)
 Grand National Night (1946)
Frenchie and the Lily (1952)
Murder Story (1954)
Nude with Violin (1958)
Who'll Come A-Waltzing (1962–63)

References

External links 
 
 Campbell Copelin's Australian theatre credits at AusStage
Campbell Copelin items at National Film and Sound Archive

1988 deaths
English male film actors
English male stage actors
English male television actors
English male radio actors
20th-century English male actors
1901 births
British emigrants to Australia